Atari Games & Recreations is a book written by Herb Kohl and published by Reston Publishing in 1982.

Contents
Atari Games & Recreations is a book about game design on the Atari 400 and 800.

Reception
Michael Cranford reviewed the game for Computer Gaming World, and stated that "I had hoped for more information and a deeper more intricate, look at the gaming functions of the Atari microcomputer. In any case, the book is very well done and should prove to be a great asset to the beginner. For those with a more advanced programming background, skim through this one before you buy it."

Reviews
The Reader's Guide To Microcomputer Books
ANALOG Computing
Popular Computing
Software Merchandising

References

Books about video games